Graham Shaw may refer to:

Graham Shaw (musician), Canadian musician and vocalist
Graham Shaw (footballer, born 1934) (1934–1998), English footballer who played for Sheffield United
Graham Shaw (footballer, born 1951), Scottish footballer who played for Hearts in the 1976 Scottish Cup Final
Graham Shaw (footballer, born 1967), English footballer who played for Stoke City, Preston North End and Rochdale
Graham Shaw (cricketer) (born 1966), former English cricketer
Graham Shaw (field hockey) (born ca. 1979), former Irish field hockey player and coach of the Irish ladies team

See also
Graeme Shaw, rugby league footballer for Scotland and at club level for Oldham Roughyeds